Bedford was a provincial electoral district in Nova Scotia, Canada, that elected one member of the Nova Scotia House of Assembly. Its current Member of the Legislative Assembly is Kelly Regan.

The electoral district was created in 1978 as Bedford-Musquodoboit Valley from the redistribution of Halifax Cobequid. The name was changed to Bedford-Fall River in 1993 and the district lost the Musquodoboit Valley area to Colchester-Musquodoboit Valley.

In 2003, the district was renamed Bedford. It lost the Fall River and Waverley areas and gained one third of Halifax Bedford Basin, as well as an area along the Hammonds Plains Road. It comprises most of Bedford and all of the community southeast of the Bicentennial Highway.

The district is notable for the electoral loss of Liberal leader Francis MacKenzie, in the 2006 election.  MacKenzie attempted to win the seat in 2006 for the Nova Scotia Liberal Party. The party polled less than 24% across the province.  He lost by more than 800 votes to Len Goucher.

On September 30, 2008 the name of the Bedford district was officially changed to Bedford-Birch Cove. With the 2012 electoral boundary changes, the area of Kearney Lake and Birch Cove moved to Clayton Park West and name of the district officially changed back to Bedford.

In the 2021 Nova Scotia general election, the riding was abolished into Bedford South and Bedford Basin.

Members of the Legislative Assembly
This riding has elected the following Members of the Legislative Assembly:

Election results

1978 general election

1981 general election

1984 general election

1988 general election

1993 general election

1998 general election

1999 general election

2003 general election

2006 general election

2009 general election

2013 general election 

|-
 
|Nova Scotia Liberal Party|Liberal
|Kelly Regan
|align="right"|6,081
|align="right"|60.66
|align="right"|+16.18
|-
 
|Nova Scotia Progressive Conservative Party|Progressive Conservative
|Joan Christie
|align="right"|2,026
|align="right"|20.21
|align="right"|-0.54
|-
 
|New Democratic Party
|Mike Poworozynk
|align="right"|1,701
|align="right"|16.97
|align="right"|-15.53
|-

|}

2017 general election

External links
 2006 riding profile
 2003 riding profile
 Kelly Regan

References

Elections Nova Scotia, Complete Results and Statistics (August 5, 2003). Retrieved Dec 14, 2007
Elections Nova Scotia, Complete Results and Statistics (June 13, 2006). Retrieved Dec 14, 2007

Nova Scotia provincial electoral districts
Politics of Halifax, Nova Scotia